Chirpan Peak is an ice-covered  peak forming the western extremity of Bowles Ridge on Livingston Island in the South Shetland Islands, Antarctica overlooking Perunika Glacier to the west and south.  The peak is named after the town of Chirpan in southern Bulgaria.

Location

Bulgarian mapping in 2005 and 2009 from the Tangra 2004/05 topographic survey.

Maps
 L.L. Ivanov et al. Antarctica: Livingston Island and Greenwich Island, South Shetland Islands. Scale 1:100000 topographic map. Sofia: Antarctic Place-names Commission of Bulgaria, 2005.
 L.L. Ivanov. Antarctica: Livingston Island and Greenwich, Robert, Snow and Smith Islands. Scale 1:120000 topographic map.  Troyan: Manfred Wörner Foundation, 2009.  
 A. Kamburov and L. Ivanov. Bowles Ridge and Central Tangra Mountains: Livingston Island, Antarctica. Scale 1:25000 map. Sofia: Manfred Wörner Foundation, 2023.

References
 Chirpan Peak. SCAR Composite Gazetteer of Antarctica
 Bulgarian Antarctic Gazetteer. Antarctic Place-names Commission. (details in Bulgarian, basic data in English)

External links
 Chirpan Peak. Copernix satellite image
Chirpan

Mountains of Livingston Island